The Journal of Near-Death Studies is a quarterly peer-reviewed academic journal devoted to the field of near-death studies. It is published by the International Association for Near-Death Studies.

The journal's founding editor-in-chief was Kenneth Ring. Subsequent editors were Bruce Greyson and Janice Holden.

History 
The journal was established in 1982 as Anabiosis and obtained its current title in 1987 with the start of volume 6. From 1997 to 2003 the journal was published by Kluwer Academic Publishers, but this arrangement was discontinued upon completion of volume 21.

See also 
 Journal of Parapsychology
 Journal of the American Society for Psychical Research
 Near-death experience
 Near-death studies

References

External links 
 

Publications established in 1982
Psychology journals
Quarterly journals
English-language journals
Near-death experiences